Todd Edward Steussie (born December 1, 1970) is a former American football guard and tackle for Minnesota Vikings, Carolina Panthers, Tampa Bay Buccaneers, and St. Louis Rams of the National Football League (NFL). He was drafted by the Minnesota Vikings 19th overall in the 1994 NFL Draft. He attended the University of California, Berkeley and played college football for the California Golden Bears.

High school years
Steussie attended Agoura High School graduating in 1989 in Agoura Hills, California, and was a letterman in football. In football, he was a first team All-State selection as a defensive lineman.

NFL career
After a stellar college career at Cal, which included becoming a 3-time All-Pac-10 and Morris Trophy winner for the top offensive lineman in the Pac-10, Steussie was drafted 19th overall by the Minnesota Vikings. He was the fourth offensive tackle to be drafted in 1994, after Bernard Williams, Wayne Gandy, and Aaron Taylor. Steussie was a part of a big offensive line with the Vikings alongside Randall McDaniel, Jeff Christy, David Dixon, and Korey Stringer and was named to two All-Pro teams and two Pro Bowls during his seven-year tenure with the Vikings. (The Pro Bowls following the 1997 and 1998 seasons)  He played in 10 playoff games with the Vikings including 2 NFC Championship games (1998+2000 seasons)

Steussie was signed by the Carolina Panthers before the 2001 season and was part of an offensive line that allowed  team record 29 sacks during a 1-15 season. Two years later, Steussie made his first Super Bowl appearance in Super Bowl XXXVIII. In 2004, he was released by the Panthers.

Steussie would play the next two seasons with the Tampa Bay Buccaneers and joined the St. Louis Rams in 2006, where he became a starter for the first time since the 5th game of the 2004 season. He started 15 games in 2006 (8 at LT, 7 at LG). During this year, he helped Steven Jackson and Marc Bulger to breakout Pro Bowl seasons.  He was given an injury settlement after undergoing foot surgery on August 31, 2007. Before week 12, Steussie was signed by the Rams after his foot fully recovered from surgery.   He came back to  the Rams and started 4 days later.  Steussie then started the final six games. He was a free agent after the 2007 season.

External links
St. Louis Rams bio

1970 births
Living people
Players of American football from Los Angeles
American football offensive guards
American football offensive tackles
California Golden Bears football players
Minnesota Vikings players
National Conference Pro Bowl players
Carolina Panthers players
Tampa Bay Buccaneers players
St. Louis Rams players